Lefavirales is an order of viruses.

Classification
Lefavirales contains the following three families:

 Baculoviridae
 Hytrosaviridae
 Nudiviridae

References

Viruses
Virus orders